Abraham Lincoln High School, usually referred to simply as Lincoln High School, is a secondary school located in the Lincoln Heights district of Los Angeles, California, United States. Located in the East Los Angeles-area community, surrounded by El Sereno, Chinatown, Boyle Heights and Cypress Park. The school is named after Abraham Lincoln, the 16th President of the United States, and was one of the first public high schools established in California. It is one of the District 5 high schools in the Los Angeles Unified School District, the second largest school district in the US.

Lincoln students are drawn from Chinatown and other areas. Cypress Park residents may attend either Lincoln or Franklin High School.

History

The early history of Lincoln High School is unusually complicated because, over the years, it has served all three of the typical grade configurations—elementary school, middle school and high school. What eventually became Lincoln High School was originally established in 1878 as Avenue 21 Grammar School. By 1913, the Avenue 21 school had become an intermediate school and its student population had grown to the point that a new campus was needed. That year the intermediate school moved to the present Lincoln High School site, and the curriculum expanded to include the senior high school grades. This marks the true beginning of Lincoln High. Pending the construction of a new school (the current site) on the former mansion property of Charles Woolwine, the Avenue 21 intermediate school moved its location to the hillside site (now the current physical education and track field), where students studied under the trees. In the early 1970s, students from all six upper grades attended the school together.

In 1878, the plant was extended across Lincoln Park Avenue, which is now the current site. In 1881, the school added a gymnasium. In 1924, a science building was added. The present school was built extensively in the 1940s under President Franklin D. Roosevelt's Works Progress Administration reform. Much of the construction and renovations occurred after the 1933 Long Beach earthquake, which damaged the gymnasium, the auditorium, the music building, the library and the English building. Jim Tunney Stadium, home to Lincoln's football and track teams, was built during the reconstruction of Lincoln High School.

It was in the Los Angeles City High School District until 1961, when it merged into LAUSD.

Beginning in the latter part of the 1960s, Lincoln High School became a focal point for the emerging Chicano civil rights movement that was fueled by student activism which called for a more culturally sensitive educational curriculum and access to college preparatory courses for Mexican American students. Encouraged by Sal Castro, who championed equal educational opportunity as a Lincoln High faculty member, students at Lincoln organized a mass walk-out in protest of sub-standard facilities, vocational program tracking for Chicano youth and discriminatory practices which excluded them from advanced college prep courses. In March 1968, Lincoln High students led the first wave of what became the largest student strike in the history of public education in US. The "Blow-out" was joined by students from at least three other area high schools, among them Garfield, Roosevelt, Lincoln, Belmont and Wilson.

In 2009 the opening of the Felicitas and Gonzalo Mendez Learning Centers relieved Lincoln.

In 2015, Lincoln High School's baseball team won the CIF Los Angeles City Section Division II baseball championship, defeating Cesar Chavez High School of San Fernando by a score of 3–0 in a game played at Dodger Stadium. It was the school's second baseball championship, and the first one since 1935.

Demographics

Lincoln is mainly made up of a large Hispanic and Asian student body, though there is a smaller African-American and White student population.

In 2019, Lincoln serves around 1,005 students in grades nine to twelve, with a student-teacher ratio of 19:1 (54 full-time teachers).

The racial/ethnic enrollment breaks down as the following (as of the student class of 2008–2009):
 American Indian - 0.3%
 Asian - 30.8%
 Filipino - 0.3%
 Pacific Islander - 0.1%
 Black - 0.9%
 Hispanic - 80.1%
 White - 0.5%

Academics

Overview
In 2008, Lincoln was ranked as the 900th best high school in the US in the Challenge Index.

US News 2021 Rankings
55 in Los Angeles Unified School District High Schools
249 in Los Angeles metropolitan area high schools
387 in Magnet high schools
587 in California high schools
3,841 in national rankings

US News 2020 Rankings
94 in Los Angeles Unified School District High Schools
234 in Los Angeles metropolitan area high schools
374 in Magnet high schools
565 in California high schools
3,810 in national rankings

US News 2019 Rankings
241 in Los Angeles metropolitan area high schools
350 in Magnet high schools
566 in California high schools
3,926 in national rankings

Magnet
Lincoln High School's Magnet program was established in 1999. The Magnet program has a maximum of 226 students, ranging from grade levels 9 to 12. The program offers opportunities for students to participate in courses and activities with an emphasis on science, mathematics and technology.

Science Bowl
Lincoln has a Science Bowl team that has been running for fifteen years. Lincoln has two teams with 5 students in each team. Competing students must have a knowledge base in astronomy, biology, chemistry, mathematics, physics and general science. Science Bowl uses a buzzer system, in which students must buzz in and wait to be recognized by a moderator before proceeding to answer a question. Lincoln has consistently scored in the top five in the Regional Science Bowl competition.

Academic Decathlon
Lincoln maintains an Academic Decathlon program for its students. Competing students in the program are placed into one of three teams based on their skill level: Varsity, Scholastic and Honors. The program covers language & literature, economics, art, music, mathematics, social science and science. In addition, students are required to write essays, participate in interviews, give speeches and take part in a Super Quiz, which focuses on a selected subject determined by the United States Academic Decathlon each year.

Speech and Debate
Formed in 2008, Lincoln is one of the 15 schools that are a part of the Los Angeles Metropolitan Debate League (LAMDL). LAMDL is one of the networks of Urban Debate Leagues that promotes debate for many urban high schools. In 2009, the Los Angeles Urban Debate League (as it was previously known) merged with a USC's Neighborhood Debate League, creating LAMDL.

Lincoln has a highly successful policy debate team, competing and winning major tournaments both locally and nationally. Lincoln has won some of the most prestigious tournaments in California, including the California State Invitational held at the University of California Berkeley as well as the Pepperdine Invitational Debates, and clearing into eliminations in tournaments like the University of Southern California's David Damus Trojan Championships. In 2009, Lincoln won four of the six local tournaments, winning City Championships, and, in 2010, won five of the six local tournaments. In 2009, Lincoln debated at the Chase Urban Debate Nationals, held in Chicago, and returned to the Nationals again in 2010, clearing into eliminations, and again in 2011, placing fifth overall.

Academic Performance Index (API)
API for Lincoln High School.

Feeder Patterns
A majority of the students come from Florence Nightingale Middle School, El Sereno Middle School.

Notable alumni

 Rodolfo Acosta, actor
 Gregory Ain, architect
 Ethel Percy Andrus, principal 1917–1944, founder AARP, first female high school principal in California
 Sam Balter (1909–1998), basketball player
 Eddie Cano, Afro-Cuban jazz and Latin jazz pianist
 Gaylord Carter, organist
 Bobby Castillo, former Los Angeles Dodgers and Minnesota Twins pitcher
 Sal Castro, activist (faculty)
 Eldridge Cleaver, writer - Soul on Ice
 John Conte, actor
 John Doucette, actor
 Sue Kunitomi Embrey, Japanese-American teacher, activist and Manzanar intern
 Moctesuma Esparza, director, producer
 Jackie Fields (Jacob Finkelstein; 1908–1987), boxer who twice won the World Welterweight Championship
 Jennifer Love Hewitt, actress/singer
 John Huston, director/actor
 Fidel LaBarba, boxer, sportswriter, gold medalist 1924 Olympics (Paris)
 José Limón, choreographer
 Carlos R. Moreno, California Supreme Court Justice (Cl. of 1966)
 Sadao Munemori, Medal of Honor recipient
 Jeanette Nolan, actress
 Robert Preston, actor
 Ref Sanchez, actor and fashion photographer
 Jim Tunney, L. A. Unified School District administrator, NFL referee
 Kenny Washington, (NFL) professional American football player
 Robert Young, actor

Media
Abraham Lincoln High School is used prominently as both itself and the fictional "Clayton College" in the 1927 Buster Keaton film College and briefly appears at the end of the movie Walkout (a real life video in the end credits).

References

External links
 Abraham Lincoln High School website
 Early history of Abraham Lincoln High School
 Abraham Lincoln High School profile provided by the Los Angeles Unified School District

Los Angeles Unified School District schools
High schools in Los Angeles
Lincoln Heights, Los Angeles
Public high schools in California
Eastside Los Angeles
Educational institutions established in 1878
1878 establishments in California
School buildings completed in 1940
Works Progress Administration in California
PWA Moderne architecture in California